Irene Andreou (born 28 April 1998) is a Cypriot footballer who plays as a forward for the Cyprus women's national team.

International career
Andreou capped for Cyprus at senior level during the 2023 FIFA Women's World Cup qualification.

References

External links

1998 births
Living people
Cypriot women's footballers
Women's association football forwards
Cyprus women's international footballers